Rastko Poljšak (born 1899, date of death unknown) was a Slovenian gymnast. He competed in nine events at the 1924 Summer Olympics.

References

External links
 

1899 births
Year of death missing
Slovenian male artistic gymnasts
Olympic gymnasts of Yugoslavia
Gymnasts at the 1924 Summer Olympics
Sportspeople from Ljubljana